The 1939–40 season was the 31st year of football played by Dundee United, and covers the period from 1 July 1939 to 30 June 1940.

Match results
Dundee United played a total of 36 unofficial matches during the 1939–40 season.

Legend

All results are written with Dundee United's score first.
Own goals in italics

Second Division

League suspended due to World War II.

Emergency War League Eastern Division

Scottish War Emergency Cup

References

Dundee United F.C. seasons
Dundee United